Jeder stirbt für sich allein (1970) is a German television miniseries produced by DEFA in the former German Democratic Republic. The story was adapted from the 1947 Hans Fallada novel, Every Man Dies Alone, known in the UK as Alone in Berlin. It was directed by  Hans-Joachim Kasprzik and starred Erwin Geschonneck.

Background 
The three-part miniseries was directed by Hans-Joachim Kasprzik, who also co-wrote the screenplay. It stars Erwin Geschonneck and Else Grube-Deister as Otto and Anna Quangel. It is based on a true story, that of Otto and Elise Hampel, a working class couple in wartime Berlin who began a postcard campaign to resist the Nazis and the Third Reich and were arrested, tried before the Volksgerichtshof and executed at Plötzensee Prison.

Synopsis 
The story takes place in Berlin in 1940, where Otto Quangel is a toolmaker at a factory. His wife, Anna, is a homemaker. Though their son is fighting on the front, they are apolitical and Otto is not a member of any political party. Otto and Anna learn that their son has fallen "like a hero" in France and are devastated. In addition, a Jewish neighbor meets a violent death. In his grief and horror, Otto becomes politicized and decides to take action against the Nazis, hoping to foment a mass rebellion against Hitler. Though nothing comes of their efforts, the Quangels remain proud of what they've done; it enabled them to retain their faith in humanity. They are arrested, separated, tried, sentenced and executed.

Reception 
The kabel eins film lexicon calls the miniseries, "A star-studded, evocative, solid film that centers on the anti-fascist resistance struggle of a working class couple."

Cast (partial list) 
 Erwin Geschonneck as Otto Quangel
 Else Grube-Deister as Anna Quangel
 Wolfgang Kieling as Kommissar Escherich
 Dieter Franke as Gruppenführer Prall
 Fred Düren as Emil Borkhausen
 Fred Delmare as Enno Kluge
 Helga Göring as Eva Kluge
 Erika Dunkelmann as Hete Häberle
 Heinz Scholz as "der alte" Persicke
 Traudi Harprecht

See also 
 Jeder stirbt für sich allein (1962, West Germany), the first screen adaptation of Fallada's book, produced in West Germany
 Everyone Dies Alone (1975, West Germany), the first cinematic version of Fallada's book
 List of Germans who resisted Nazism

References

External links 
 
 Part two Cinema.de
 Part three Cinema.de

1970 German television series debuts
1970 German television series endings
1970s German television miniseries
World War II television drama series
Television shows based on German novels
Television in East Germany
German-language television shows
Films about the German Resistance
Adaptations of works by Hans Fallada